Messac may refer to:

Persons 

 Achille Messac, aerospace engineer
 Magali Messac, ballet dancer

Places  

Messac, Charente-Maritime
Messac, Ille-et-Vilaine